Bald Mountain is a mountain located in the Catskill Mountains of New York west-northwest of Gilboa. Mount Jefferson is located north-northwest, and Mine Hill is located north of Bald Mountain.

References

Mountains of Schoharie County, New York
Mountains of New York (state)